Lynn Hefley is a former state legislator in Colorado. A Republican, she served in the Colorado House of Representatives for El Paso County, Colorado.

She is married to Joel Hefley. They have thee daughters.

She introduced the National Heritage Areas Policy Act. She was involved in drafting legislation to protect restaurants from claims about obesity and health related damages. She supported reforms to Colorado's juvenile justice system.

References

This draft is in progress as of October 18, 2022.

Year of birth missing (living people)
Living people
People from El Paso County, Colorado
Women state legislators in Colorado
Republican Party members of the Colorado House of Representatives
Spouses of Colorado politicians